The Judge is a 1949 American crime film directed by Elmer Clifton and starring Milburn Stone, Katherine DeMille and Paul Guilfoyle.

Plot

Cast
 Milburn Stone as Martin Strang 
 Katherine DeMille as Lucille Strang 
 Paul Guilfoyle as William Jackson 
 Stanley Waxman as Dr. James Anderson 
 Norman Budd as James Tillton 
 Jonathan Hale as Judge Allan J. Brooks 
 John Hamilton as Lt. Edwards 
 Joseph Forte as District Attorney 
 Jess Kirkpatrick as Patrolman Patrick Riley 
 Herb Vigran as Reporter 
 Barney Phillips as Reporter 
 Charles Williams as Reporter 
 Tom Holland as Court Photographer 
 Bob Jellison as Court Clerk

References

Bibliography
 Fetrow, Alan G. Feature Films, 1940-1949: a United States Filmography. McFarland, 1994.

External links
 

1949 films
1949 crime films
1940s English-language films
American crime films
Films directed by Elmer Clifton
Film Classics films
American black-and-white films
1940s American films